Benedict is a city in Wilson County, Kansas, United States, along the Verdigris River.  As of the 2020 census, the population of the city was 69.

History
Benedict had its start in the year 1866 by the building of the railroad through that territory. Benedict was laid out at the junction of the Atchison, Topeka and Santa Fe Railway and the Missouri Pacific Railroad. It was named for S. S. Benedict.

Geography
Benedict is located at  (37.627014, -95.743500).

Climate
The climate in this area is characterized by hot, humid summers and generally mild to cool winters.  According to the Köppen Climate Classification system, Benedict has a humid subtropical climate, abbreviated "Cfa" on climate maps.

Demographics

2010 census
As of the census of 2010, there were 73 people, 34 households, and 19 families residing in the city. The racial makeup of the city was 89.0% White, 2.7% Native American, 4.1% from other races, and 4.1% from two or more races. Hispanic or Latino of any race were 4.1% of the population.

There were 34 households, of which 14.7% had children under the age of 18 living with them, 44.1% were married couples living together, 5.9% had a female householder with no husband present, 5.9% had a male householder with no wife present, and 44.1% were non-families. 29.4% of all households were made up of individuals, and 20.6% had someone living alone who was 65 years of age or older. The average household size was 2.15 and the average family size was 2.74.

The median age in the city was 54.8 years. 13.7% of residents were under the age of 18; 5.4% were between the ages of 18 and 24; 19.1% were from 25 to 44; 26% were from 45 to 64; and 35.6% were 65 years of age or older. The gender makeup of the city was 50.7% male and 49.3% female.

2000 census
As of the census of 2000, there were 103 people, 46 households, and 23 families residing in the city. The racial makeup of the city was 97.09% White and 2.91% Native American.

There were 46 households, out of which 23.9% had children under the age of 18 living with them, 45.7% were married couples living together, 4.3% had a female householder with no husband present, and 50.0% were non-families. 45.7% of all households were made up of individuals, and 21.7% had someone living alone who was 65 years of age or older. The average household size was 2.24 and the average family size was 3.39.

In the city, the population was spread out, with 29.1% under the age of 18, 3.9% from 18 to 24, 19.4% from 25 to 44, 31.1% from 45 to 64, and 16.5% who were 65 years of age or older. The median age was 44 years. For every 100 females, there were 94.3 males. For every 100 females age 18 and over, there were 97.3 males.

The median income for a household in the city was $20,625, and the median income for a family was $30,625. Males had a median income of $35,625 versus $16,250 for females. The per capita income for the city was $11,842. There were 19.0% of families and 27.1% of the population living below the poverty line, including 33.3% of under eighteens and 26.3% of those over 64.

Education
Benedict is served by USD 484 Fredonia.

Benedict High School was closed through school unification. The Benedict High School mascot was Bulldogs.

References

Further reading

External links
 Benedict - Directory of Public Officials
 USD 484, local school district
 Benedict city map, KDOT

Cities in Kansas
Cities in Wilson County, Kansas